The Armed Forces of Honduras, consists of the Honduran Army, Honduran Navy and Honduran Air Force.

History

Pre-1979
The Armed Forces of Honduras were created through article 44, subsection 4 of the First Constitution of the Legislative Chamber in 1825, with the First Supreme Head of State being the Attorney Dionisio de Herrera, for which, they ordered the effective birth of the Honduran army in dated December 11, 1825 and for its greater mobility, it was divided into battalions with the name of each of the seven departments Comayagua the capital, Tegucigalpa, Choluteca, Olancho, Yoro, Gracias and Santa Bárbara that were in charge of strategically and tactically covering order and defense of the state, under French military doctrine. In 1831 the Military School was created with a seat at the San Francisco Barracks, and Colonel Narciso Benítez of Colombian origin was appointed director; From this school graduated: Francisco Morazán, José Antonio Márquez, Diego Vigil, Liberato Moncada, Joaquín Rivera and José Santos Guardiola who were presidents of Honduras, among others.

The first weaponry used was flintlock and gunpowder, the product of mixing sulfur, saltpeter, and coal in relative quantities: the Remington single-load rifle was one of the first bullet rifles that were introduced into the country during the government of General José María Medina. .

The second stage of the Armed Forces is between the years 1842 and 1876 when the collective uniform emerged in the mid-1840s when the troops of General José Santos Guardiola faced those of General Nicolás Ángulo, in 1845 in the " Combate del Obrajuelo ", in San Miguel, El Salvador.
In 1865 the first attempt was made to organize a Naval Force with its respective regulations; however, the cost of this service made it unsustainable; However, there were several attempts to reactivate the idea and one of them was carried out by Doctor Policarpo Bonilla, who ordered the construction of the Tatumbla steamship in the Kiel shipyard, Germany on November 22, 1895 and then in 1896 respectively, General Manuel Bonilla had the 'Hornet built. While he administered Honduras, the Doctor and General Don Tiburcio Carias Andino also ordered the construction of the steamers Búfalo and El Tigre. On January 1, 1881, the first Military Code of the Honduran army was issued, a legal instrument to govern its own organization.
During the twentieth century, Honduran military leaders frequently became presidents, either through elections or by coups d'état. General Tiburcio Carías Andino was elected in 1932, he later on called a constituent assembly that allowed him to be reelected, and his rule became more authoritarian until an election in 1948.

During the following decades, the military of Honduras carried out several coups d'état, starting in October 1955. General Oswaldo López Arellano carried out the next coup in October 1963 and a second in December 1972, followed by coups in 1975 by Juan Alberto Melgar Castro and in 1978 by Policarpo Paz García.

1980s
Events during the 1980s in El Salvador and Nicaragua led Honduras – with US assistance – to expand its armed forces considerably, laying particular emphasis on its air force, which came to include a squadron of US-provided F-5s.

The military unit Battalion 316 carried out political assassinations and the torture of suspected political opponents of the government during this same period. Battalion members received training and support from the United States Central Intelligence Agency, in Honduras, at U.S. military bases and in Chile during the presidency of the dictator Augusto Pinochet. Amnesty International estimated that at least 184 people "disappeared" from 1980 to 1992 in Honduras, most likely due to actions of the Honduran military.

1990s
The resolution of the civil wars in El Salvador and Nicaragua, and across-the-board budget cuts made in all ministries, has brought reduced funding for the Honduran Armed Forces. The abolition of the draft has created staffing gaps in the now all-volunteer armed forces. The military is now far below its authorized strength, and further reductions are expected. In January 1999, the Constitution was amended to abolish the position of military Commander-in-Chief of the Armed Forces, thus codifying civilian authority over the Military.

2000s
Since 2002, soldiers have been involved in crime prevention and law enforcement, patrolling the streets of the major cities alongside the national police.

2009

On 28 June 2009, in the context of a constitutional crisis, the Military, acting on orders of the Supreme Court of Justice, arrested the President Manuel Zelaya, after which they forcibly removed elected President Zelaya from Honduras. See the article 2009 Honduran constitutional crisis regarding claims regarding legitimacy and illegitimacy of the event, and events preceding and following the removal of Zelaya from Honduras.

The military's chief lawyer, Colonel Herberth Bayardo Inestroza Membreño, made public statements regarding the removal of Zelaya. On June 30, he showed a detention order, apparently signed June 26 by a Supreme Court judge, which ordered the armed forces to detain the president. Colonel Inestroza later stated that deporting Zelaya did not comply with the court order: "In the moment that we took him out of the country, in the way that he was taken out, there is a crime. Because of the circumstances of the moment this crime occurred, there is going to be a justification and cause for acquittal that will protect us." He said the decision was taken by the military leadership "in order to avoid bloodshed".

Following the 2009 ouster of the president, the Honduran military together with other government security forces were allegedly responsible for thousands of allegedly arbitrary detentions and for several forced disappearances and extrajudicial executions of opponents to the de facto government, including members of the Democratic Unification Party. However, evidence about these actions has yet to be provided and there has been some questioning in local media about the actual perpetrators, suggesting that they could actually be related to disputes within the leftists organizations themselves.

Army 

The Honduran Army is the land service branch of the Armed Forces of Honduras.

 101th Brigade in Choluteca
 105th Brigade in San Pedro Sula
 110th Brigade in Danli
 115th Brigade in Juticalpa
 120th Brigade in Santa Rosa de Copan

Air Force

The FAH operates from four air bases located at:
 Hernan Acosta Mejia Air Base at Tegucigalpa
 Soto Cano Air Base at Comayagua,
 Armando Escalon Espinal Air Base at La Lima, Cortés
 Hector Caraccioli Moncada at La Ceiba.

With the exception of Soto Cano Air Base, all other air bases operate as dual civil and military aviation facilities.

Additionally, three air stations are located at:
 Catacamas
 Alto Aguán (bomb range)
 Puerto Lempira airstrips serve as forward operations locations-FOL.

Also a radar station operates at:
 La Mole peak.

Navy
The Navy is a small force dealing with coastal and riverine security.

The Navy has 71 patrol boats, interceptors and landing craft units.

The Honduran navy has 4 naval bases:

 Base Naval Puerto Cortés – main repair and logistics base on the Caribbean Sea
 Base Naval Puerto Castilla – main operating base of patrol boats on the Caribbean Sea
 Base Naval Amapala – main operating base of coastal patrol craft on the north end of the island and only base on the Pacific Ocean side of Honduras
 Base Naval Caratasca – new base to deal with drug trafficking

Additionally, the Honduran navy has the following unit and schools:

 1st. Marine Infantry Battalion – only marine unit located at La Ceiba
 Honduras Naval Academy – Trains officers for the Honduras Navy at La Ceiba
 Naval Training Center – NCO and Sailor training facility

Military-civilian relations and leadership
According to a statement in July 2009 by a legal counsel of the Honduras military, Colonel Herberth Bayardo Inestroza, part of the elite Honduran Military generals were opposed to President Manuel Zelaya, whom the Military had removed from Honduras via a military Coup d'état, because of his left-wing politics. Inestroza stated, "It would be difficult for us [the military], with our training, to have a relationship with a leftist government. That's impossible."

The current Head of the Armed Forces is Carlos Antonio Cuéllar, graduate of the General Francisco Morazan Military Academy and the School of the Americas. In January 2011, the General Rene Arnoldo Osorio Canales, former Head of the Presidential Honor Guard, was appointed Commander.

As of 2012 the Honduran Military has the highest military expenditures of all Central America. They have 52,225 troops in their Army, they have 16,500 troops in their Air Force, and 5,300 troops in their Navy.

Equipment

Hand guns
 Beretta 92FS
 Beretta 93R
 CZ 75
 Browning Hi-Power

Sub machine guns
 Mini Uzi
 MP5
 CZ Scorpion Evo 3

Rifles
 Beretta AR70/90
 M16A1/A2
 M4A1
 IWI ACE
 IWI X95
 FN FAL
 T65 assault rifle

Sniper rifles
 Remington 700
 M40 rifle
 M21
 M110 SASS (used by Honduras Army Special Forces)

Machine guns
 FN Minimi
 FN MAG
 M60 Machine gun M60, M60D.
 M2 Machine gun
 Stoner 63
 Ultimax 100
 MG 3 machine gun

Rocket launchers
 120x Carl Gustav recoilless rifle
 80x M40 recoilless rifle
 M72 LAW
 M203
 RPG-2
 RPG-7
 Heckler & Koch HK69A1 (used by Honduran Army Special Forces)
 Mk 19 grenade launcher (used by Honduran Army since 2013, donated by the United States for anti-narcotics operations)

Medium artillery
 60mm mortar
 400x 81mm M1\M29 Mortar

Vehicles and artillery

See also
Honduran presidential plane

References

External links